Joseph Steven Knotts  (March 3, 1884 – September 15, 1950) was a Major League Baseball catcher.

External links 

1884 births
1950 deaths
Boston Doves players
Major League Baseball catchers
Baseball players from Pennsylvania
Chester (minor league baseball) players
Concord Marines players
Worcester Busters players
Harrisburg Senators players
Buffalo Bisons (minor league) players
Jersey City Skeeters players
Memphis Turtles players
Johnstown Johnnies players
Syracuse Stars (minor league baseball) players
Atlanta Crackers players
Chattanooga Lookouts players
York White Roses players